Ebbe Hartz (born 11 March 1966) is a Danish cross-country skier. He competed at the 1992 Winter Olympics and the 1994 Winter Olympics.

References

External links
 

1966 births
Living people
Danish male cross-country skiers
Olympic cross-country skiers of Denmark
Cross-country skiers at the 1992 Winter Olympics
Cross-country skiers at the 1994 Winter Olympics
Sportspeople from Aarhus
20th-century Danish people